The Liwa Oasis is a large oasis area in the Western Region of the Emirate of Abu Dhabi, the United Arab Emirates.

Geography 

It consists of some 50 villages. The geographic and economic center of the oasis is Muzayri`, where the highway from Abu Dhabi enters the oasis and then divides to the east ( to the easternmost village, Mahdar Bin `Usayyan) and west ( to the westernmost village, `Aradah). According to the census of population of 2005, the population was 20,196. Earlier estimates judging from satellite images which gauged the population at 50,000 to 150,000, were too high. The villages of Liwa Oasis are the southernmost settlements of Abu Dhabi and of the United Arab Emirates. However, there is no road linking Liwa Oasis and Shaybah, and no border crossing. A modern, multi-lane highway connects the oasis area to the capital, Abu Dhabi.

Villages 

The USGS Geographic Names Database lists 39 populated places in the area of the oasis, which are listed from west to east in the following table.

Economy 

An important traditional branch of the economy is date farming. There is a widespread use of drip irrigation and greenhouses. The importance of tourism is on the rise. There are several hotels in the area including the Liwa Hotel in Muzayri`, Tilal Liwa Hotel, the Liwa Rest House in the same village and run by the government of Abu Dhabi, and the resort Qasr Al Sarab.

It attracts people every year during the Liwa festival a large number of international and local visitors coming to see the offroad and camel racing events.

History 
The oasis is the place of birth of the ruling families of Abu Dhabi and Dubai. In 1793, the ruling family Al Nahyan moved their residence from Liwa to the Abu Dhabi.

Traditionally, men from Liwa (Bani Yas tribe) were pearl divers on the coast during the summer months. Pearl diving offered an additional source of income.

In popular culture 
East of Liwa Oasis, in the Rub' Al Khali desert, was the set of Star Wars: The Force Awakens and it was used to represent Jakku, a desert planet.

Desert scenes of Sonic the Hedgehog (film) were filmed in Liwa Oasis.

The desert landscape of Liwa was filmed to represent the planet Arrakis in the 2021 film Dune.

Gallery

See also
Moreeb Dune
Al Ain Oasis

References

External links

 Liwa Desert Activities
   Newvisaguide

Western Region, Abu Dhabi
Oases of the United Arab Emirates